Casimero Bustamante Padilla Sr. (March 4, 1926 – January 17, 1988), professionally known as Roy Padilla, was a Filipino politician serving as Governor of the province of Camarines Norte, a member of Corazon Aquino's People Power ticket. He was succeeded by his son, Roy Padilla Jr. He briefly went on to use the name "Carlos Roy Padilla" on his earlier brief stint as an actor and director.

Career
Padilla was four-time mayor of bayside town Jose Panganiban, SSS Commissioner, Vice Governor of Camarines Norte, Representative to Batasang Pambansa and Governor of Camarines Norte. 

He was an organizer and National President of National Mines and Allied Workers Union, an epitome in labor unionism in the country with tens of thousands of members, mostly in mining industry, nationwide, at its peak.

He was president after his tenure as vice-president of Miners' International Federation based in England.

He was a delegate of Philippines to International Labour Organization of the United Nations in Geneva, Switzerland, representing Labor.

Personal life
Padilla was born Casimero Bustamante Padilla on March 4, 1926, in Plaridel, Bulacan, he was the father of actors Rommel, Robin, Royette and actress BB Gandanghari. He is also the father of politicians Casimero "Roy" Aquino Padilla Jr., a former Governor, Congressman and Vice Governor of Camarines Norte, and Ricarte "Dong" Robledo Padilla, former Mayor of Jose Panganiban and currently Governor of Camarines Norte.

There is a park named after him in the town of Jose Panganiban.

Assassination
He was assassinated on January 17, 1988, on the eve of national elections in Labo, Camarines Norte. He was 61, and was buried in Camarines Norte.

References

1926 births
1988 deaths
Governors of Camarines Norte
Assassinated Filipino politicians
People murdered in the Philippines
Bicolano politicians
People from Camarines Norte
People from Plaridel, Bulacan
Roy